Luis Hierro was an Uruguayan politician.

Background 

His political roots were in the Department of Treinta y Tres, in the interior of the country.

His son Luis Hierro Gambardella became a Minister, Deputy and Senator. His grandson Luis Antonio Hierro López became Vice President of Uruguay in 2000.

Political role and legacy 

Hierro served as a Deputy for the Department of Treinta y Tres from 1920 to 1923. This constituency was in 1955 to elect his son Luis Hierro Gambardella to the same office.

See also 

 Politics of Uruguay
 List of political families#Uruguay

References 

Year of birth missing
Year of death missing
Election people of Uruguay
People from Treinta y Tres Department
Colorado Party (Uruguay) politicians
Members of the Chamber of Representatives of Uruguay